The great egret (Ardea alba), also known as the common egret, large egret, or (in the Old World) great white egret or great white heron is a large, widely distributed egret.  The four subspecies are found in Asia, Africa, the Americas, and southern Europe.  Recently it is also spreading to more northern areas of Europe. Distributed across most of the tropical and warmer temperate regions of the world, it builds tree nests in colonies close to water.

Taxonomy and systematics
Like all egrets, it is a member of the heron family, Ardeidae. Traditionally classified with the storks in the Ciconiiformes, the Ardeidae are closer relatives of pelicans and belong in the Pelecaniformes, instead. The great egret—unlike the typical egrets—does not belong to the genus Egretta, but together with the great herons is today placed in Ardea. In the past, however, it was sometimes placed in Egretta or separated in a monotypic genus Casmerodius.

The Old World population is often referred to as the "great white egret". This species is sometimes confused with the great white heron of the Caribbean, which is a white morph of the closely related great blue heron.

The scientific name comes from Latin ardea, "heron", and alba, "white".

Subspecies
Four subspecies are found in various parts of the world, which differ but little. Differences among them include bare-part coloration in the breeding season and size. The smallest subspecies, A. a. modesta, is from Asia and Australasia and some taxonomists consider it to be a full species, the eastern great egret (Ardea modesta), but most scientists treat it as a subspecies.

 A. a. alba Linnaeus, 1758 – nominate, found in Europe and across the Palearctic.
 A. a. egretta Gmelin, JF, 1789 – found in the Americas
 A. a. melanorhynchos Wagler, 1827 – found in Africa
 A. a. modesta Gray, JE, 1831 – eastern great egret, found in India, Southeast Asia, East Asia and Oceania

Description

The great egret is a large heron with all-white plumage. It is thus only slightly smaller than the great blue or grey heron (A. cinerea). Apart from size, the great egret can be distinguished from other white egrets by its yellow bill and black legs and feet, though the bill may become darker and the lower legs lighter in the breeding season. In breeding plumage, delicate ornamental feathers are borne on the back. Males and females are identical in appearance; juveniles look like nonbreeding adults. Differentiated from the intermediate egret (Ardea intermedia) by the gape, which extends well beyond the back of the eye in case of the great egret, but ends just behind the eye in case of the intermediate egret.

Its flight is slow with its neck retracted. This is characteristic of herons and bitterns, and distinguishes them from storks, cranes, ibises, and spoonbills, which extend their necks in flight. The great egret walks with its neck extended and wings held close. The great egret is not normally a vocal bird; it gives a low, hoarse croak when disturbed, and at breeding colonies, it often gives a loud croaking cuk cuk cuk and higher-pitched squawks.

Owing to its wide distribution across so much of the Americas, as well as Africa, Europe and Asia, the great egret shares its habitat with many other similar species. For example, the little egret (Egretta garzetta), intermediate egret (Ardea intermedia), Chinese egret (Egretta eulophotes), and the western reef heron (Egretta gularis). In the Americas, the snowy egret (Egretta thula)—a medium-sized heron that shares the same habitat as the great egret—is one such species. The snowy egret is readily distinguished from the great egret because it is noticeably smaller, and it has a more slender bill which is black in color and yellow feet, whereas the great egret has a yellow bill and black feet. Another species that—in North America—is easily confused with the great egret is the white morph of the great blue heron (Ardea herodias). The great blue heron is a bit larger, and has a thicker bill than that of the great egret.

Distribution and habitat

The great egret is generally a very successful species with a large and expanding range, occurring worldwide in temperate and tropical habitats. It is ubiquitous across the Sun Belt of the United States and in the Neotropics.

Conservation
In North America, large numbers of great egrets were killed around the end of the 19th century so that their plumes, known as "aigrettes", could be used to decorate hats. Numbers have since recovered as a result of conservation measures. Its range has expanded as far north as southern Canada. However, in some parts of the southern United States, its numbers have declined due to habitat loss, particularly wetland degradation through drainage, grazing, clearing, burning, increased salinity, groundwater extraction and invasion by exotic plants. Nevertheless, the species adapts well to human habitation and can be readily seen near wetlands and bodies of water in urban and suburban areas.

The great egret is partially migratory, with northern hemisphere birds moving south from areas with colder winters. It is one of the species to which the Agreement on the Conservation of African-Eurasian Migratory Waterbirds (AEWA) applies.

In 1953, the great egret in flight was chosen as the symbol of the National Audubon Society, which was formed in part to prevent the killing of birds for their feathers.

On 22 May 2012, a pair of great egrets was observed nesting in the UK for the first time at the Shapwick Heath nature reserve in Somerset. The species was a rare visitor to the UK and Ben Aviss of the BBC stated that the news could mean the UK's first great egret colony had become established. The following week, Kevin Anderson of Natural England confirmed a great egret chick had hatched, making it a new breeding bird record for the UK. In 2017, seven nests in Somerset fledged 17 young, and a second breeding site was announced at Holkham National Nature Reserve in Norfolk where a pair fledged three young. In January 2021, Bird Guides, a UK website and magazine which reports sightings of rare birds, dropped the species from its list of nationally rare birds because sightings had become so numerous.

A similar move northwards has been observed in the Nordic countries where historically it was only a rare visitor. The first confirmed breeding in Sweden was 2012 and in Denmark was 2014.  Both countries now have small colonies. In 2018, a pair of great egrets nested in Finland for the first time, raising four young in a grey heron colony in Porvoo.

Ecology

It begins to breed at 2–3 years of age by forming monogamous pairs each season. Whether the pairing carries over to the next season is not known. The male selects the nest area, starts a nest, and then attracts a female. The nest, made of sticks and lined with plant material, could be up to 3 feet across. Up to six bluish green eggs are laid at one time. Both sexes incubate the eggs, and the incubation period is 23–26 days. The young are fed by regurgitation by both parents and are able to fly within 6–7 weeks.

Diet

The great egret forages in shallow water or in drier habitats, feeding mainly on fish, frogs, other amphibians, small mammals (such as mice), and occasionally small reptiles (such as snakes), crustaceans (such as crayfish) and insects (such as crickets and grasshoppers). This species normally impales its prey with its long, sharp bill by standing still and allowing the prey to come within the striking distance of its bill, which it uses as a spear. It often waits motionless for prey or slowly stalks its victim.

Parasites
A long-running field study (1962–2013) suggested that the great egrets of central Europe host 17 different helminth species. Juvenile great egrets were shown to host fewer species, but the intensity of infection was higher in the juveniles than in the adults. Of the digeneans found in central European great egrets, numerous species likely infected their definitive hosts outside of central Europe itself.

In culture
The great egret is depicted on the reverse side of a 5-Brazilian reais banknote.

The great egret is the symbol of the National Audubon Society.

An airbrushed photograph of a great egret in breeding plumage by Werner Krutein is featured in the cover art of the 1992 Faith No More album Angel Dust.

In Belarus, a commemorative coin has the image of a great egret. The great egret also features on the New Zealand $2 coin and on the Hungarian 5-forint coin.

Gallery

See also
 Little egret
 Intermediate egret

References

External links

 
 Ageing and sexing (PDF) by Javier Blasco-Zumeta & Gerd-Michael Heinze
 Great White Heron – The Atlas of Southern African Birds
 Great White Egret – National Park Neusiedlersee Seewinkel in Austria
 Great Egret – Cornell Lab of Ornithology
 Great egret Ardea alba – USGS Patuxent Bird Identification InfoCenter
 
 
 
 

great egret
great egret
Birds of Africa
Birds of the Americas
Birds of the Dominican Republic
Birds of Eurasia
Birds of Japan
Fauna of the San Francisco Bay Area
great egret
Taxa named by Carl Linnaeus
Cosmopolitan birds